Imma monocosma is a moth in the family Immidae. It was described by Alexey Diakonoff and Yutaka Arita in 1979. It is found on the Japanese islands of Kyusyu and Honshu.

The wingspan is 20–22 mm for males and 24–25 mm for females. The forewings are light fuscous, rather dull, with hardly any purplish tinge and with some slight pale greyish opalescence in certain lights. The costal edge is pale yellow and the posterior half of the wing is densely suffused with light ochreous yellow, the edge of this colour with a deep excision in the middle, including a darker fuscous round dot on its top, on the middle of the closing vein, the yellow half dusted with light fuscous, except anteriorly and on the costa. There is a strongly curved transverse row of suffused and partly interconnected small fuscous interneural spots from below one-third of the costa to the tornus, running well before the termen, followed by elongate, wedge-shaped fuscous marks on the ends of the veins and a slender pale leaden-metallic marginal line from the costa before the apex to above the tornus, sometimes entirely obliterate. The hindwings are pale grey fuscous, with a slight silky gloss, becoming slightly darker beyond the middle posteriorly, the costa pale except towards the apex.

References

Moths described in 1979
Immidae
Moths of Japan